Gnomibidion denticolle is a species of beetle in the family Cerambycidae. It was described by Dalman in 1823.

References

Neoibidionini
Beetles described in 1823